Samuel Sandys, 1st Baron Sandys (1695–1770) was British politician who served as Chancellor of the Exchequer.

Samuel Sandys   may refer to:
Samuel Sandys (died 1623) (1560–1623), English landowner and politician
Samuel Sandys (Royalist) (1615–1685), English politician, grandson of the above
Samuel Sandys (died 1701) (–1701), English politician, son of the above, grandfather of the 1st Baron Sandys

See also
Sandys (surname)